Nationality words link to articles with information on the nation's poetry or literature (for instance, Irish or France).

Events
 Italian poet Ludovico Ariosto begins writing Orlando Furioso (earliest version published in 1516; first complete version published 1532)

Works published
 Anonymous, Sir Tryamour, publication year uncertain; written in the late 14th century
 William Dunbar, The Thrissil and the Rois, Scotland, a political allegory honoring Margaret Tudor, whose marriage to James IV of Scotland had been negotiated with the help of Dunbar
 Jean Lemaire de Belges, La Plainte du Désiré, Belgian Walloon poet living in and published in France

Births
Death years link to the corresponding "[year] in poetry" article:
 June 28 – Giovanni della Casa (died 1556), Italian poet and critic; Latin-language poet
 November 17 – Agnolo di Cosimo, better known as "Il Bronzino" or "Agnolo Bronzino" (died 1572), Italian Mannerist painter and poet
 Nicholas Bourbon in this year or 1505  (died 1550), French court preceptor and poet
 Diego Hurtado de Mendoza (died 1575), Spanish
 Benedetto Varchi, some sources say he may have been born this year, others say his birth year is either this year or 1502 (died 1565), Italian, Latin-language poet
 Garcilasco de la Vega (died 1536), Spanish
 Sir Thomas Wyatt, born about this year (died 1542), English lyrical poet

Deaths
Birth years link to the corresponding "[year] in poetry" article:
 Antonio Bonfini (born 1434), Italian humanist and poet
 Alessandro Braccesi (born 1445), Italian, Latin-language poet
 Matteo Canale (born 1443), Italian, Latin-language poet
 Gian Giacomo della Croce died this year or later (born c. 1450), Italian, Latin-language poet
 Iovianus Pontanus, also known as Giovanni Gioviano Pontano, (born 1426), Italian, Latin-language poet
 Annamacharya శ్రీ తాళ్ళపాక అన్నమాచార్య (born 1408), mystic saint composer of the 15th century, widely regarded as the Telugu  (grand old man of simple poetry); husband of Tallapaka Tirumalamma

See also
 Poetry
 16th century in poetry
 16th century in literature
 French Renaissance literature

 Grands Rhétoriqueurs
 Renaissance literature
 Spanish Renaissance literature

Notes

16th-century poetry
Poetry